The RPG-43 (ruchnaya protivotankovaya granata obraztca 1943 goda, meaning hand-held anti-tank grenade) was a high-explosive anti-tank (HEAT) shaped charge hand grenade used by the Soviet Union during World War II. It entered service in 1943, replacing the earlier models RPG-40 and RPG-41; the RPG-40 used a simpler high explosive (HE) warhead. Later in the war, it was improved and became the RPG-6.

History
During the early days of Operation Barbarossa, the USSR's only infantry anti-armour weapons were anti-tank rifles, anti-tank guns, and anti-tank hand grenades. These were adequate against early German tanks such as the Panzer I and Panzer II but, as the war progressed, they were found to be nearly useless against the heavier Panthers and Tigers. The RPG-43 was developed as a result, and it was produced in large numbers until the end of the war. After the war it was passed on extensively to Soviet client states, and was used in the many Arab–Israeli conflicts. Despite being thoroughly outdated, it can still be encountered in many third world nations, mainly due to its reliability and low cost.

Description
The RPG-43 externally was shaped like an oversized stick grenade with a 95 mm HEAT warhead on the end. When thrown, a cylindrical metal cone was released from the rear of the grenade and held by fabric strips to stabilise flight and increase the likelihood of a 90 degree hit. Its range was limited by how far a user could throw it, and was obviously shorter than the contemporary rocket-propelled  US Bazooka and recoilless German Panzerfaust, so that the user had to get closer and was in more danger of being seen. However, it was much smaller than rocket weapons and produced no sound, smoke, or light when launched, and thus did not betray a thrower's position. Despite its limits, it was cheap and fast to manufacture, allowing it to become the main Soviet infantry anti-tank weapon of World War II.

Tactics
Overall the RPG-43 was an awkward and difficult weapon to use effectively. To use it, the user had to get within throwing range of an enemy tank, which was often dangerous. Despite having a powerful warhead, it took a skilled user to make the most of it as, like all shaped-charge weapons, it was effective only if the striking angle was close to 90 degrees. It also had to hit hard enough to detonate the impact fuse, or it would bounce harmlessly off the tank.

Users

  - used by Georgian military and militia units during 1990s period.

See also
 Panzerwurfmine
 List of Russian weaponry

References

External links
 RPG-43 on Inert-Ord.net

Hand grenades of the Soviet Union
Anti-tank grenades
World War II infantry weapons of the Soviet Union
Weapons and ammunition introduced in 1943